Chariesthes gestroi is a species of beetle in the family Cerambycidae. It was described by Stephan von Breuning in 1934. It is known from Somalia, Kenya and Uganda.

References

Chariesthes
Beetles described in 1934